Allan Bouch (19 January 1903 – 23 April 1997) was an Australian rules footballer who played for the Richmond Football Club in the Victorian Football League (VFL).

Notes

External links 

1903 births
1997 deaths
Australian rules footballers from Victoria (Australia)
Richmond Football Club players